Saltdale is an unincorporated community in Kern County, California.

The town was founded in 1914 for salt harvesting from Koehn Dry Lake.

A post office operated at Saltdale from 1916 to 1950.

See also
Category: Mining communities in California

References

Mining communities in California
Populated places in the Mojave Desert
Unincorporated communities in Kern County, California
Populated places established in 1914
Unincorporated communities in California